is a species of flowering plant in the family Hydrangeaceae that is endemic to Iriomote in the Yaeyama Islands, Okinawa Prefecture, Japan.

Taxonomy
The species was first described by Japanese botanist Jisaburō Ōi in 1938.

Description
The oval to ovate leaves are finely serrated, while the ovoid winter buds open into clusters of some five to ten flowers, with white petals and dark yellow anthers.

Distribution
Deutzia yaeyamensis is endemic to Iriomote in the Ryūkyū Islands, where it may be found growing in sunny spots on the cliffs that flank the island's rivers.

Conservation status
Deutzia yaeyamensis is classed as Endangered on the IUCN Red List and Ministry of the Environment Red List. The species has been designated a National Endangered Species under the 1992 Act on Conservation of Endangered Species of Wild Fauna and Flora, and its collection and/or relocation are prohibited.

References

yaeyamensis
Flora of the Ryukyu Islands
Endemic flora of Japan
Species described in 1938